Jerome Hassan Smith (born April 1991) is a former American football running back. He was born in Chester, Pennsylvania and played college football at Syracuse University before being signed as an undrafted free agent by the Atlanta Falcons of the National Football League in 2014.  He was promoted to the active roster on December 24.

In 2015, Smith was on the Falcons pre-season roster but did not survive the final cuts to make the 53 man team. He is currently the Running Backs Coach at Morgan State University.

References

1991 births
Living people
American football running backs
Atlanta Falcons players
Players of American football from Pennsylvania
Sportspeople from Chester, Pennsylvania
Syracuse Orange football players
People from New Castle, Delaware
Players of American football from Delaware
Morgan State Bears football coaches